Jaime Manuel Tohá González (born 9 August 1938) is a Chilean politician and engineer who served as minister of State in his coutnry.

He has an honorary degree at the San Sebastián University.

References

External links
 Profile at BCN

1938 births
Living people
Chilean engineers
20th-century Chilean politicians
21st-century Chilean politicians
University of Chile alumni
Technical University of Madrid alumni
Socialist Party of Chile politicians
Broad Party of Socialist Left politicians